La Paz  is an eastern department of Mendoza Province in Argentina.

Districts

Desaguadero
La Paz Norte
La Paz Sur
Villa Antigua

External links

 Municipal Site (Spanish)
Mendoza Cuyo Site (Spanish)

1850 establishments in Argentina
Departments of Mendoza Province